Martin v. District of Columbia Court of Appeals, 506 U.S. 1 (1992), was a Supreme Court opinion denying a petition for motion to proceed in forma pauperis, as the petitioner had repeatedly abused the process. Specifically, the Court prohibited the petitioner from filing further non-criminal in forma pauperis petitions, and that all petitions filed must be compliant with Court rules and must have had the filing fee paid. The dissent, written by Justice Stevens, argued that the result violated the "open access" of the Court.

See also
 List of United States Supreme Court cases
 Lists of United States Supreme Court cases by volume
 List of United States Supreme Court cases by the Rehnquist Court

References

External links

United States Supreme Court cases
United States Supreme Court cases of the Rehnquist Court